Jang Ye-eun (born August 10, 1998), better known as Yeeun, is a South Korean singer and rapper signed to Superbell Company. She is best known as the main rapper of the South Korean girl group, CLC. She was a part of longest-running pair of host at SBS MTV's The Show, from May 2018 to November 2019, together with Lee Jeno.

Early life and education 
Yeeun was born and raised in Dongducheon, Gyeonggi, South Korea. She has an older sister. She attended Dongbo Elementary School, Dongducheon Girls' Middle School and School of Performing Arts Seoul. She graduated from the latter in February 2017.

Career

Pre-debut 
In 2014, Yeeun made appearances in the music videos for "G.NA's Secret" by G.NA, and "Beep Beep" by BtoB. Yeeun also participated in "G.NA's Secret" promotional activities as a backing dancer with fellow Cube Entertainment trainees.

2015–2021: Debut and career with CLC 

On March 10, 2015, Yeeun was revealed as the main rapper of the girl group CLC. The group officially debuted on March 19, 2015, with their debut single, "Pepe", from their debut EP, First Love.

Solo activities 
On March 20, 2018, Yeeun made her runway debut for Greedilous at the 2018 F/W Hera Seoul Fashion Week, which was held at Dongdaemun Design Plaza.

On May 21, 2018, SBS MTV announced that Yeeun has been selected to be a host of The Show starting from the 149th episode, aired on May 22, 2018, alongside NCT Dream's Jeno and Jin Longguo. After the latter left, they continued to be hosts as a duo until 212th episode, aired on November 26, 2019.

Together with fellow CLC member, Oh Seung-hee, Yeeun had featured on the original soundtrack for the drama, My Fellow Citizens!, with the song "Really Bad Guy", released on April 22, 2019.

In May 2020, Yeeun joined the cast of the Mnet music competition show, Good Girl. Yeeun had participated in total of 3 songs at the show. She performed "Witch" with Hyo-yeon, Cheetah, Jamie, and Jiwoo of Kard on 6th episode. She then performed the other two alone, "Barbie" on the same episode and "Mermaid" on final episode. She promoted the former on the 672nd episode of M Countdown. She then released a special solo music video for "Mermaid" on the CLC YouTube channel in the run-up to CLC's September 2020 release, Helicopter.

In June 2021, Cube Entertainment announced that Yeeun would make her acting debut with her fellow members, Oh Seung-hee and Jang Seung-yeon, in the short film anthology series, Tastes of Horror. The short film premiered at the 26th Bucheon International Fantastic Film Festival in 2022.

2022–present: Departure from Cube Entertainment and solo debut 
On March 18, 2022, Cube Entertainment announced that Yeeun would be leaving the company after choosing to not renew her contract with the company.

On August 11, SuperBell Company revealed that Yeeun had signed exclusive contract with them as a solo artist.

Yeeun had a featuring on the single "Nirvana Girl", sang by her fellow group member, Sorn, which was released on September 15. She also a featuring once more on oceanfromtheblue's single "Come Back Home", released on November 22.

In March 2023, SuperBell Company announced that Yeeun would be making her solo debut on April 13, her debut was preceded by the release of the digital single "Strange Way To Love" on March 20, 2023.

Public image

In the media 
Yeeun is well known for having sported a bob cut during CLC promotions spanning 2018 to 2019, gaining the moniker of "단발머리 걔" (short-haired girl) in the Korean media.

Endorsements 
Yeeun participated in the Spring/Summer 2016 and Fall/Winter 2016 TBJ campaigns, alongside BtoB. In August 2020, Yeeun was announced to be the brand model for Cosio's Super Glass Care Treatment line.

Discography

Singles

Promotional singles

Soundtrack appearances

Guest appearances

Songwriting credits
All credits are adapted from the Korea Music Copyright Association, unless stated otherwise.

Filmography

Film

Television

Web shows

Radio

Music videos

References

External links

1998 births
Living people
People from Dongducheon
South Korean lyricists
South Korean women rappers
South Korean women pop singers
21st-century South Korean women singers
CLC (group) members
Cube Entertainment artists
South Korean female idols
School of Performing Arts Seoul alumni
Japanese-language singers of South Korea
English-language singers from South Korea